David Allister Bennett (born 28 October 1970) is a New Zealand National Party politician. He was first elected the Member of Parliament for Hamilton East in 2005, and became a list MP in 2020. He was Minister for Food Safety and Minister of Veterans' Affairs in final year of the Fifth National Government.

Early years
Bennett was born on 28 October 1970 in Hamilton. He attended St John's College, Hamilton before gaining an LLB and a BCA from Victoria University of Wellington. Bennett owns two dairy farms near Te Awamutu, and has also worked as an accountant for KPMG, in Auckland.

Member of Parliament

Fifth Labour Government, 2005–2008
In the 2005 election, Bennett stood as the National Party's candidate for the Hamilton East seat. He was successful, defeating the incumbent MP, Dianne Yates of the Labour Party. In his maiden speech, he remarked that at age 34, he was the youngest National MP elected at that election. In his first term, he was a member of the Transport and Industrial Relations committee. He was an associate spokesperson for transport under National leader John Key from 1 December 2006.

Fifth National Government, 2008–2017 
Bennett retained Hamilton East for the duration of the Fifth National Government, defeating Labour candidate Sue Moroney three times. He was a member of the Finance and Expenditure Committee from December 2008 to January 2017 (the last two years as chair), the Transport and Industrial Relations Committee from December 2008 to August 2014 (the last three years as chair), and the Foreign Affairs, Defence and Trade Committee from 2014 to 2017.

He was appointed Minister for Food Safety, Minister for Veterans' Affairs, and Associate Minister of Transport (outside Cabinet) after Bill English became Prime Minister in December 2016, and was additionally appointed Minister of Racing in 2017. On appointment, Bennett noted he was the first MP for a Hamilton electorate to become a minister since 1984 (when Ian Shearer completed a term as Minister for the Environment). He introduced the Government's Racing Amendment Bill in July 2017 but it was abandoned after National lost the 2017 election.

Sixth Labour Government, 2017–2020
At the 2017 general election, Bennett retained Hamilton East by 5,810 votes over new Labour candidate Jamie Strange, but lost to Strange by a margin of 2,973 votes at the 2020 general election. Despite that loss, he was returned as a list MP.

The National Party was in opposition from October 2017. Bennett held various spokesperson roles for the party, including food safety and racing under the leadership of Bill English, corrections and land information under Simon Bridges, agriculture under Todd Muller and Judith Collins, and economic and regional development under Christopher Luxon.

Bennett briefly served as an Assistant Speaker of the House in August 2022. He will retire at the 2023 New Zealand general election.

Political views 
In 2005, Bennett voted for the Marriage (Gender Clarification) Amendment Bill, which would have amended the Marriage Act to define marriage as only between a man and a woman. He opposed the Marriage (Definition of Marriage) Amendment Bill at its first and second readings in 2012 and 2013, but voted in support at its final reading in 2013. He supported the Conversion Practices Bill at second and third reading in 2022.

In 2009, Bennett voted against the Misuse of Drugs (Medicinal Cannabis) Amendment Bill, a bill aimed at amending the Misuse of Drugs Act so that cannabis could be used for medical purposes. 

In 2019 and 2020, he voted for the Abortion Legislation Bill at all stages. In 2022, he supported the Contraception, Sterilisation, and Abortion (Safe Areas) Amendment Bill at its second and third reading.

Personal life
Bennett was in a long-distance relationship with Australian senator Bridget McKenzie and both are members of their respective countries' National Parties with Senator McKenzie having served as her party's deputy leader between 2017 and 2020. On 26 July 2022 Bennett announced his intention to step down from Parliament at the 2023 election in order to spend more time with his fiancee Nicky Preston and their first child.

References

External links
Official website

Profile at National Party

1970 births
Living people
New Zealand National Party MPs
New Zealand list MPs
Victoria University of Wellington alumni
Members of the New Zealand House of Representatives
New Zealand MPs for North Island electorates
People from Hamilton, New Zealand
People educated at St John's College, Hamilton
21st-century New Zealand politicians
Candidates in the 2017 New Zealand general election
Candidates in the 2020 New Zealand general election